Nordic Deep is the warmest coldwater freediving competition in the world. Located in Lysekil, Sweden. The depth is >90m.

References 
Nordic Deep

External links 

Freediving